Einstruction was an American educational technology company with offices in Denton, Texas, Scottsdale, Arizona, Fort Wright, Kentucky, and Paris, France.

History
eInstruction was founded in 1981 by computer science professor Darrell Ward. In 2000, Ward and his team developed student response systems in education, with the creation of a hand-held "clicker" system called CPS (Classroom Performance System). In addition to CPS and other interactive classroom technologies, Einstruction worked with educators providing professional development and training. Einstruction was purchased by Turning Technologies in 2013.

Products

eInstruction introduced a wireless student response system intended to help educators engage and involve students using real-time feedback.

In the 1990s, eInstruction sold a radio frequency (RF) response system manufactured by Fleetwood. During the late 1990s, eInstruction began to develop its own student response units that were infrared (IR) instead of RF. At that point, only six student response units could be used concurrently. In 1999–2000, eInstruction modified the IR signal allowing the system to receive up to 32 responses.

eInstruction released a chalkboard tablet in 2003. In 2003, eInstruction partnered with Fleetwood to build an RF version of the IR student response system for the K–12 marketplace. In 2004, Fleetwood built an RF response system for eInstruction designed specifically for the higher education market.

The company was awarded a U.S. patent for its mobile interactive whiteboard in 2005.

In 2006, eInstruction acquired FS Creations, which developed the Examview test bank.

eInstruction acquired Interwrite Learning in 2008, which included GTCO CalComp. GTCO produced tablets with wireless and Bluetooth connectivity.

In 2009, eInstruction released a mobile interactive whiteboard tablet, as well a system which allowed multiple students to use the same board simultaneously. There was also a mobile add-on, which allowed various smart device to be used in interactive activities and assessments.

eInstruction also created the online resource community eI Community, the enterprise-based administrator tool eI Cornerstone Education Suite, and the Insight 360 Formative Instruction System.

Awards

CPS
 2005 winner of the Award of Excellence by Technology & Learning.
 2005 Media & Methods portfolio winner
 2006 Technology Leadership Award winner by AOL@School
 2007 winner of the Award of Excellence by Technology & Learning
 2008 Teacher's Choice Award winner by Learning Magazine
 2009 winner of the Award of Excellence by Technology & Learning
 2009 winner of the Best in Technology by Scholastic Administrator
 2009 Teacher's Choice Award winner by Learning Magazine.

Other
 MOBI and INTERWRITEWORKSPACE software both earned a 2010 Teachers' Choice Award from Learning magazine.
 MOBI won a 2009 Award of Excellence as Best New Product from Tech & Learning magazine.
 INTERWRITEWORKSPACE was selected for a 2009 Best in Tech Award from Scholastic Administrator magazine

References

External links
 eInstruction's (US) Website
 eInstruction's eI Community Portal
 eInstruction's (EU) Website

Educational technology companies of the United States
Companies based in Arizona